Sports Car GT is a 1999 racing sim game based on GT racing. It was published by Electronic Arts (EA) and developed by Image Space Incorporated for Microsoft Windows, and Point of View for PlayStation. Both editions of the game feature co-development by Westwood Studios. The PC version received "favorable" reviews, while the PlayStation version received "mixed" reviews.

Overview
It features a range of cars including from BMW, McLaren, Porsche, Panoz, Vector, Mosler, Callaway, Lister and Saleen.

On PC if the graphics add-on is selected by the user to be installed for SCGT, the game will show off enormously improved graphics. If the add-on is not selected by the user to be installed, the game's graphics show their age. It has various easily noticeable errors (many car's tires sink into the ground, and the shadows sit slightly above it). Typical polygon counts are in the low thousands. A major gripe of SCGT players is that the headlights have no effect on the dashboard view.

Season mode
In season mode (championship), the player has to race in four GT classes. Each of these classes have five race tracks (GT1 has four). The player starts in the GT qualifying class (GTQ), and progressly gets to GT3, GT2 and GT1 classes.

The player gets cash when they finish in the top three in each race. The player begins with $50,000 for the purchase of their first car. This gives the option to  purchase an expensive car and hit the circuit, or purchase an inexpensive car and put extra money towards upgrades right away. The "paddock" is the garage area where the player will maintain and upgrade their cars. In the car shop, cars can be bought and sold.

All cars can be upgraded. The player can modify the car to increase its performance and value. Once a component has been upgraded, it can be installed or removed at any time. Components that can be upgraded are: brakes, suspension, exhaust, engine, gearbox, aero kit and the tires of the car. The player can tune their car; not in making a design to the car or spray with colour, but change the optimum performance of the car. Components that can be adjusted are: brakes, suspension, ride height, transmission, gearbox, downforce and the tires.

When a whole class is finished (all five races), the final results are shown. If the player has done well enough, there will be a special race held. The player can accept or not. If the player accepts, they will race against a car that has not been available. The player needs to beat the CPU player to win their car and $150,000.

The first race in the first class (GTQ) is Sebring International Short, with three laps. The final race of the first class (GT1) is Sebring International Raceway, with 20 laps. The player's car does not get damaged but it can get slower from hitting other cars, people, or walls.

Paris GT1, a bonus class, is made available when a player has completely finished the GT1 class. The bonus class has the same cars as GT1 but different tracks, based in Paris, France. This bonus class has six laps per race on each of its tracks, like the GTQ and GT3 classes.

Arcade mode
The "arcade" race is a stand-alone challenge that the player can configure in a number of ways. Adjustable parameters are: the player's car, the track, race length and the opponent's GT class car.

Time trial
The "time trial" mode lets the player take the customised car saved in "season" mode and go after the track records.

Multiplayer
 Head-to-head: the player can configure a race in a number of ways and challenge an opponent to a one-on-one race.
 Pace car: similar to head-to-head, but the player and their opponent are joined by an experienced CPU-driver. 
 Pink slip (two memory cards required): same as head-to-head, but races must be run with cars saved in season mode. At the end of the race, the loser's car is deleted from his or her memory card and saved to the winner's.

Development
Sports Car GT was initially a project of Virgin Interactive until Electronic Arts bought its North American division. The game was created by entirely different developers each for the PC and PlayStation versions.

In 2005 the developers of Sports Car GT released the multi-class sim rFactor and the successor to the GMotor 1 engine first used in Sports Car GT for Windows.

Reception and legacy

The PC version received "favorable" reviews, while the PlayStation version received "mixed" reviews, according to the review aggregation website GameRankings. CD Mag rated the PC version 4 out of 5, giving praise to the physics, computer AI, and compared it to "Need for Speed meets Gran Turismo". Other reviewers have also praised the graphics. PC Gamer gave it 83 out of 100 saying that it provides the balance of playability and realism. Electric Games with a score of 7 out of 10 praised the graphics, the car and track designs, and car handling, but disliked HUD and lack of visible damage.

On the contrary, the PlayStation version received a more negative reception. Game Informer thought that the graphics were "dull" and instead recommended Gran Turismo or Need For Speed IV: High Stakes as better alternatives. GameSpot rated it 3.8 out of 10 calling it "unpolished" and criticizing the music, physics and graphics. IGN gave it 4/10 and praised the official licenses of the various cars, but said that the graphics are outdated "in almost every department", though credited the weather and night lighting effects.

The PC game retained a following and the game's open engine means hundreds of mods such as additional cars were made for it by the community.

References

External links
Sports Car GT at Image Space

1999 video games
Electronic Arts games
Image Space Incorporated games
PlayStation (console) games
Racing simulators
Racing video games set in the United States
Video games set in Canada
Video games set in England
Windows games
Video games developed in the United States
Multiplayer and single-player video games